In the 1996 Cameroonian Premier League season, 16 teams competed. Unisport Bafang won the championship.

League standings

External links
Cameroon - List of final tables (RSSSF)

Cam
Cam
1
Elite One seasons